Haeryong-myeon, also called Haeryong Township, or Haeryong for short, is a myeon (township) in Suncheon, a city in South Jeolla Province, South Korea. As of the last day of the year 2016, the population was recorded to be 46,994 people and the number of houses totaled 16,204. It is the myeon with the largest population in South Korea. The myeon office is located in 1228-10, Haeryong-ro in Woljeon-ri. There is Suncheon Bay in the south-west of the myeon; Yulchon-myeon, Yeosu in the south; Gwangyang Bay in the east; Gwangyang-eup, Gwangyang in the north-east; and Dosa-dong, Pungdeok-dong, Deogyeon-dong, Wangjo 2-dong, and Wangjo 1-dong in the west and the north-west.

History 

 1896 : Haechon-myeon and Yongdu-myeon, Suncheon-gun
 1 April 1914 : Haeryong-myeon, Suncheon-gun
 15 August 1949 : Haeryong-myeon, Seungju-gun
 1 January 1995 : Haeryong-myeon, Suncheon-si

Ri 

Haeryong-myeon has eighteen jurisdictions and eighty-three administrative districts.

Bokseong-ri 

Bokseong-ri has two administrative districts: Bokseong-ri, and Sangbi-ri. It also has East Suncheon Interchange on Suncheon–Wanju Expressway and Suncheon Bokseong High School.

Sangsam-ri 

Sangsam-ri has twenty-four administrative districts: Sangsam 1-ri to Sangsam 23-ri, and Samdong-ri. It also has Sangsam branch office.

Sindae-ri 

Sindae-ri has twenty-seven administrative districts: Pyeonghwa-ri, Bongseo-ri, Sandu-ri, Wolsan-ri, and Sindae 1-ri to Sindae 23-ri. It also has Sindae branch office since 16 January 2017.

Daean-ri 

Daean-ri has four administrative districts: Daean-ri, Soan-ri, Masan-ri, and Pungdeok-ri.

Namga-ri 

Namga-ri has three administrative districts: Namga-ri, Seoga-ri, and Daega-ri.

Woljeon-ri 

Woljeon-ri has three administrative districts: Woljeon-ri, Sinheung-ri, and Singi-ri. It also has myeon office.

Seongsan-ri 

Seongsan-ri has two administrative districts: Seongsan-ri, and Daebeop-ri. It also has Haeryong Interchange on Namhae Expressway.

Seonwol-ri 

Seonwol-ri has two administrative districts: Seonwol-ri, and Tongcheon-ri.

Sinseong-ri 

Sinseong-ri has only one administrative district: Sinseong-ri. It also has Suncheon Waeseong.

Hodu-ri 

Hodu-ri has three administrative districts: Hodu-ri, Dangdu-ri, and Gusang-ri.

Yongjeon-ri 

Yongjeon-ri has two administrative districts: Yongjeon-ri, and Sinwol-ri.

Dorong-ri 

Dorong-ri has only one administrative district: Dorong-ri. It also has Dorong Interchange on Namhae Expressway.

Jungheung-ri 

Jungheung-ri has only one administrative district: Jungheung-ri.

Haechang-ri 

Haechang-ri has only one administrative district: Haechang-ri.

Seonhak-ri 

Seonhak-ri has two administrative districts: Seonhak-ri, and Gyedang-ri.

Nongju-ri 

Nongju-ri has two administrative districts: Nongju-ri, and Nowol-ri.

Sangnae-ri 

Sangnae-ri has two administrative districts: Sangnae-ri, and Waon-ri.

Hasa-ri 

Hasa-ri has only one administrative district: Hasa-ri.

References

External links 
 Haeryong-myeon office 

Suncheon
Towns and townships in South Jeolla Province